Kovi is the professional name used by a Hungarian film director.

Awards and nominations
 2002 AVN Award winner – Best Director, Foreign Release (The Splendor of Hell - Pirate Video DeLuxe)
 2003 Venus Award winner - Best Director (Europe)

References

Hungarian pornographic film directors
Living people
Year of birth missing (living people)